The blue tuskfish, Choerodon cyanodus, is a species of wrasse native to the Indian and western Pacific Oceans, where it is known to occur around Australia, but has been claimed to occur more widely. It inhabits reefs. It can be found in the aquarium trade.

References

Blue tuskfish
Taxonomy articles created by Polbot
Fish described in 1843